Hutaytet al-Turkman (also spelled Hteitet Elturkman) is a Syrian village located in Al-Malihah Subdistrict, Markaz Rif Dimashq. Hutaytet al-Turkman had a population of 4,800 in the 2004 census.

References

Villages in Syria